This is a list of notable alumni related to the University of Birmingham and its predecessors, Mason Science College and Queen's College, Birmingham. Excluded from this list are those people whose only connection with Birmingham University is that they were awarded an honorary degree.

Heads of state and government

Nobel Prize recipients

In addition, soil scientist Peter Bullock (1958 BA Geography) contributed to the reports of the IPCC, which was awarded the Nobel Peace Prize in 2007

Academics

Agriculture

 Chris Pollock, Chief Scientific Adviser to the Welsh Assembly Government 2007-08
 Christopher Wathes, Chairman of the Farm Animal Welfare Council, awarded the Research Medal of the Royal Agricultural Society of England (BSc in Physics, 1974)

Biology

Chemistry

Computer science, mathematics and statistics

 Julian Besag, statistician, recipient of the Guy Medal in Silver (1983) (BSc in 1968)
 Mike Cowlishaw, computer scientist 
 Peter McCullagh, statistician, recipient of the Guy Medal in Bronze (1983) and in Silver (2005), and the inaugural Karl Pearson Prize
 Mary Lee Woods, mathematician and computer programmer
 Mike Worboys, mathematician and computer scientist

Cultural studies

 Paul Gilroy, sociologist and cultural theorist
 Stuart Hall, cultural theorist
 Lawrence Grossberg, cultural studies theorist
 Paul Willis, sociologist and cultural theorist
 Angela McRobbie, media studies scholar and cultural theorist

Economics

 David Bailey, economist
 Michael Beesley, industrial economist 
 David Blanchflower, labour economist
 Julian Cooper, specialist in Russian economic matters (PhD)
 Milton Ezrati, economist
 Homa Katouzian, economist, historian, political scientist and literary critic, with a special interest in Iranian studies
 Alan Williams, health economist

Education

 John Omoniyi Abiri, Nigerian academic, dean of the Faculty of Education University of Ilorin
 Mel Ainscow, Professor of Education at the University of Manchester
 William Arbuckle Reid, British curriculum theorist
 Leaena Tambyah, social worker and founder of the first school for children with multiple disabilities in Singapore

Engineering

English

 Polly Ho-Yen, author
 David Lodge, novelist and literary critic (PhD English, 1967; Professor of English)
 Lorna Sage, English academic, author and literary critic
 F. P. Wilson, literary scholar and bibliographer

Geography

 John Brian Harley, geographer and map historian
 Geoffrey J.D. Hewings, geographer 
 Terry Slater, Reader in Historical Geography
 Michael John Wise, Emeritus Professor of Geography, University of London

Geology

 Rob Larter, Marine Geolophysicist, British Antarctic Survey, awarded the Polar Medal (PhD Geological Sciences, 1991)
 Li Siguang, father of geomechanics in China
 Frank H. T. Rhodes, geologist, President of Cornell University from 1977 to 1995
 Ethel Shakespear, geologist (DSc 1906)
 Gordon Warwick, geomorphologist and speleologist
 Harry B. Whittington, palaeontologist who made a major contribution to the study of fossils of the Burgess Shale and other Cambrian fauna
 Leonard Johnston Wills, British geologist, recipient of the Wollaston Medal of the Geological Society of London in 1954

History

Humanities, management and social sciences

 Akbar S. Ahmed, anthropologist; Ibn Khaldun Chair of Islamic Studies, American University, Washington, DC
 Shahram Akbarzadeh, professor of International Relations, East European Studies and Middle Eastern Studies at the University of Melbourne
 Paul Crawford, academic, author and broadcaster; professor of Health Humanities at the University of Nottingham
 John Ellis, media academic
 Sir John Hills, professor of Social Policy at the London School of Economics; director of the ESRC Research Centre for the Analysis of Social Exclusion
 Stephen Hinton, Avalon Foundation Professor in the Humanities at Stanford University
 Alan Kennedy, Professor of Psychology from 1972–2006 at the University of Dundee
 Vincent Watts, management consultant, Vice-Chancellor of the University of East Anglia (1997–2002)
 Ian Wilson, Canadian linguist

Medicine and dentistry

Philosophy

 John Lewis, philosopher
 Bernard Mayo, English philosopher
 Constance Naden, philosopher and poet

Physics

Political science

 Stephen Gill, political scientist
 Philip Gummett, Chief Executive at the Higher Education Funding Council for Wales, Pro Vice-Chancellor, Director of the PREST institute, and Professor of Government and Technology Policy at Manchester University (BSc Chemistry, 1969)
 Richard Sakwa, Russian and European political scientist

Theology

 Robert Beckford, theologian and film-maker (PhD and later a research fellow)
 William Lane Craig, philosopher and Christian apologist 
 Gavin D'Costa, Professor of Theology at the University of Bristol
 Lynn de Silva, Sri Lankan theologian, former director of the Ecumenical Institute for Study and Dialogue, Methodist minister
 James Haire, Director of the Public and Contextual Theology Research Centre at Charles Sturt University in Canberra
 James Holt, Mormon scholar
 John M. Hull, Emeritus Professor of Religious Education at the University of Birmingham
 J. Spencer Trimingham, Islam scholar

Zoology

 Minnie Abercrombie, zoologist 
 Leslie Brent, immunologist and zoologist
 Desmond Morris, zoologist, author and TV presenter
 Karl Shuker, zoologist and cryptozoologist

Actors, comedians and directors

Armed forces

 Peter Gray, Air Commodore (ret’d) and military historian
 Alan Hawley, Major General, Director General of the Army Medical Services 2006-09 
 Sir Mike Jackson, former Chief of the General Staff, the most senior officer in the British Army
 Adrian Nance, Commodore of Royal Navy Maritime Warfare School based in HMS Collingwood, commanding officer of HMS Ark Royal 
 David Tinker, Royal Navy supply officer, killed in action, shortly before the end of the Falklands War, when HMS Glamorgan was hit by an Exocet missile

Authors and writers

Business and entrepreneurship

Charities and NGOs
 H. J. Blackham, first president and co-founder of the British Humanist Association
 Ian Bruce, academic, vice-president of the Royal National Institute of Blind People, founder and president of the Centre for Charity Effectiveness at Cass Business School
 Hany El-Banna, founder of Islamic Relief
 Monica Fletcher, Chief Executive of Education for Health (MSc Healthcare Policy and Management, 1997)
 George Hosking, founder of the WAVE Trust
 Jane Slowey, Chief Executive of The Foyer Federation
 Sir Nick Young, Chief Executive of the British Red Cross, Chief Executive of Macmillan Cancer Relief (1995-2001)

Engineers

Healthcare

Lawyers and judges

Media and journalism

Musicians

Politics and government

United Kingdom

Africa

 Hakainde Hichilema, President of Zambia

Asia

The Caribbean
 John Delaney, Attorney-General and Minister of Legal Affairs of The Bahamas (LLB Law, 1986)
 Harold Lovell, Minister of Finance, the Economy and Public Administration Antigua and Barbuda
 Alvina Reynolds, Saint Lucian minister for Health, Wellness, Human Services and Gender Relations

Europe
 Sven Giegold, Green Party MEP
 David Hallam Labour Party MEP

Middle East
 Lucien Dahdah, Lebanese foreign minister, 1975
 Abdul-Aziz Higazy, Egyptian Prime Minister, PhD 1951
 Abdulaziz bin Mohieddin Khoja, Information and Culture Minister of Saudi Arabia 2009-14

Oceania
 Gerry Bates, member of the Tasmanian House of Assembly
 Michael Johnson, member of the Australian House of Representatives 
 ʻAna Taufeʻulungaki, Tongan minister

International organisations and ambassadors

Religion

Royalty

 Prince Seeiso of Lesotho, Lesotho High Commissioner to the United Kingdom
 Prince Manucher Mirza Farman Farmaian, sixth son of Prince Abdol Hossein Mirza Farmanfarma and of Batoul Khanoum, Iran

Sport

Others

See also
 List of University of Birmingham people
 List of University of Birmingham academics

References

University of Birmingham
Birmingham
Alumni of the University of Birmingham